The United States men's national 3x3 team is a national basketball team of the United States, governed by USA Basketball.

Competitions

Summer Olympics

World Cup

Pan American Games

Honours

Medals table

Individual awards
 FIBA 3x3 World Cup MVP
 Robbie Hummel – 2019
 FIBA 3x3 World Cup Team of the Tournament
 Myke Henry – 2016
 Robbie Hummel – 2019

See also
 United States men's national under-18 3x3 team
 United States women's national 3x3 team
 United States men's national basketball team
 United States women's national basketball team

References

External links

Men's national 3x3 basketball teams
3x3